The Troy University Arboretum is an arboretum and nature preserve, located next to the Troy University campus in Troy, Alabama. The Arboretum includes , and over 300 different species of trees, as well as a  nature trail with a swamp, stream, and the  Mullis Pond. It is open to the public.

See also 
 List of botanical gardens and arboretums in Alabama

External links
 Troy University Arboretum

Botanical gardens in Alabama
Arboreta in Alabama
Troy University
Protected areas of Pike County, Alabama